Northern Peninsula may refer to:

 Great Northern Peninsula in Newfoundland, Canada
 Northern Peninsula Area Region in far northern Queensland, Australia
 Northern or Upper Peninsula of Michigan in the United States